The Vilayet of Mamuret-ul-Aziz, also referred to as Harput Vilayet ( Kharberdi Vilayet’) was a first-level administrative division (vilayet) of the Ottoman Empire in the late 19th and early 20th centuries. It was also one of the Six vilayets. The vilayet was located between Euphrates and Murat river valleys. To the northwest was Sivas Vilayet.

History

The vilayet was created in 1879-80 from a part of the Diyarbekir Vilayet that included Malatya. In 1888 by an imperial order, Hozat Vilayet was joined to Mamuret ul-Aziz.

Rev. Dr. Herman N. Barnum account of Harpoot in the 1800s,

Demographics
The accuracy of the population figures ranges from "approximate" to "merely conjectural" depending on the region from which they were gathered.

In 1912, according to the Russian statistics the vilayet of Mamuret-ul-Aziz had 450,000 residents; 168,000 were Armenians, 182,000 were Turks, 95,000 were Kurds and 5,000 were Syriac Orthodox.

Administrative divisions

Sanjaks of the vilayet:
 Mamuret-ul-Aziz Sanjak (Elazığ, Kemaliye, Arapgir, Pütürge) 
 Malatya Sanjak (Malatya, Besni, Adıyaman, Kâhta, Akçadağ)
 Dersim Sanjak (Hozat, Tunceli, Çemişgezek, Akpazar, Ovacık, Nazımiye, Mazgirt)

Footnotes

References

External links

 

 
Vilayets of the Ottoman Empire in Anatolia
History of Elazığ Province
History of Malatya Province
History of Tunceli Province
1879 establishments in the Ottoman Empire
1923 disestablishments in the Ottoman Empire